Alien Star was a fanzine for Traveller.

Description
Alien Star was a fanzine from England that focused exclusively on Traveller, and included new adventures, supplements to the game rules, ships and equipment intended for the game.

Reception
William A. Barton reviewed Alien Star in The Space Gamer No. 45. Barton commented that "If you're a real Traveller fanatic, you'll definitely find much of interest in Alien Star."

References

Fanzines
Role-playing game magazines
Traveller (role-playing game)